GTN may refer to:

 Gas Transmission Northwest
 Gdańsk Scientific Society
 Genesis Television Network, in Cedar Hill, Texas
 Gestational trophoblastic neoplasia
 Glentanner Aerodrome, in New Zealand
 Global Traffic Network, a traffic reporting service
 Global Trance Network, a German record label
 Glyceryl trinitrate
 Grangetown railway station, in Wales
 Gray Television, an American broadcaster
 Greater Talent Network, an American speakers bureau  
 Guardian Television Network, in Columbus, Ohio
 Global Television Network
Galactic Trade Network